The Strangest Things is the second studio album by American indie rock band Longwave, released on March 18, 2003, via RCA Records.

Track listing
"Wake Me When It's Over" – 4:06
"Everywhere You Turn" – 3:39
"Pool Song" – 3:00
"I Know It's Coming Someday" – 4:15
"Meet Me at the Bottom" – 4:25
"Can't Feel a Thing" – 1:30
"Tidal Wave" – 3:27
"The Ghosts Around You" – 4:14
"All Sewn Up" – 3:42
"Exit" – 3:52
"Strangest Things" – 3:13
"Day Sleeper" – 3:26
"State of Mine" (Japanese bonus track) – 3:09

References

2003 albums
Longwave (band) albums
Albums produced by Dave Fridmann
Albums recorded at Tarbox Road Studios